Summer Queen is the fifth extended play (EP) by South Korean girl group Brave Girls. It was released by Brave Entertainment on June 17, 2021. The album marks the group's first album release since their 2017 extended play Rollin'. The lead single "Chi Mat Ba Ram" was released in conjunction with the EP.

Background and release
Following the sudden success of the group's 2017 single "Rollin'" in early 2021, Brave Entertainment stated that the group would release new material during the summer. On June 7, 2021, Brave Entertainment unveiled that the group's fifth extended play, titled Summer Queen would be released on June 17, marking their first new material since "We Ride" in August 2020, and first EP release single Rollin' in March 2017.

On June 29, 2021, The Brave Entertainment CEO purposely 'leaked' a snippet of the would Chi Mat Ba Ram (Acoustic Version). This would end up being featured on the repackaged album as its second track. On July 9, 2021, Brave Girls released the Piano Version of Summer By Myself as a standalone single. This was later added to the repackaged album as the fourth and final track. On August 4, 2021, Brave Entertainment confirmed that Brave Girls would be releasing a repackaged album, but could not give more details at the time. On August 8, 2021, Brave Girls officially announced the plans to release a repackage of the album on their official Twitter. The Repackage, titled After 'We Ride', was released on August 23, 2021, with the lead single of the same name, as well as an accompanying music video.

Track listing

Awards and nominations

Charts

Weekly charts

Monthly charts

Certification and sales

|}

Release history

References

2021 EPs
Brave Girls albums
Brave Entertainment albums